The 2017 WGC-Dell Technologies Match Play was the 19th WGC Match Play, played March 22–26 at Austin Country Club in Austin, Texas. It was the second of four World Golf Championships in 2017. Dustin Johnson won the final 1 up over Jon Rahm.

Field
The field consists of the top 64 players available from the Official World Golf Ranking on March 12. However, the seedings are based on the World Rankings on March 19.

Henrik Stenson (ranked 5 on March 12, personal reasons), Adam Scott (8, personal reasons), Justin Rose (13, personal reasons), and Adam Hadwin (51, personal reasons) did not compete, allowing entry for Jason Dufner (ranked 65), Kim Kyung-tae (66), Joost Luiten (67) and Pat Perez (68). On March 17, world number nine Rickie Fowler dropped out, replaced by Kim Si-woo (69).

Nationalities in the field

Past champions in the field

Format
In 2014 and earlier editions, the championship was a single elimination match play event. A new format was introduced in 2015, and the championship now starts with pool play, with 16 groups of four players playing round-robin matches, on Wednesday through Friday. The top 16 seeded players are allocated to the 16 groups, one in each group. The remaining 48 players are placed into three pools (seeds 17–32, seeds 33–48, seeds 49–64). Each group has one player randomly selected from each pool to complete the group.

All group play matches are limited to 18 holes with one point awarded for a win and one-half point for a halved match. Ties for first place in a group are broken by a sudden-death stroke play playoff, beginning on hole 1.

The winners of each group advance to a single-elimination bracket on the weekend, with the round of 16 and quarterfinals on Saturday, and the semi-finals, finals, and consolation match on Sunday.

Rank – Official World Golf Ranking on March 19, 2017.

Results

Pool play
Players were divided into 16 groups of four players and played round-robin matches Wednesday to Friday.
Round 1 – March 22
Round 2 – March 23
Round 3 – March 24

Notes: Round 1

Of the 32 matches played, 10 were "upsets" with the lower seeded player beating the higher seeded player and 5 matches were halved. These included top seeds #2 Rory McIlroy, #5 Jordan Spieth, and #11 Danny Willett losing matches, #3 Jason Day conceding his match and withdrawing from the tournament and #4 Hideki Matsuyama, #7 Sergio García, #9 Patrick Reed, and #16 Matt Kuchar halving matches.

Notes: Round 2

Of the 32 matches played, 15 were upsets with the lower seeded player beating the higher seeded player and 2 matches were halved. These included top seeds #4 Hideki Matsuyama, #6 Justin Thomas, #9 Patrick Reed, #15 Branden Grace and #16 Matt Kuchar losing matches and #3 Jason Day conceding his match. Gary Woodland withdrew from the tournament for personal reasons, conceding his second- and third-round matches and Francesco Molinari withdrew after the second round with a wrist injury, conceding his third-round match. There were 14 players that had perfect 2–0–0 records, including the top seed, Dustin Johnson.

Notes: Round 3

Of the 32 matches played, 14 were upsets with the lower seeded player beating the higher seeded player and 3 matches were halved. These included top seeds #3 Jason Day (concession), #4 Hideki Matsuyama, #6 Justin Thomas, #7 Sergio García, #9 Patrick Reed, #10 Tyrrell Hatton, and #15 Danny Willett losing matches and #2 Rory McIlroy, #5 Jordan Spieth, and #13 Bubba Watson halving matches. Five groups went to sudden-death playoffs, three involving two players and two involving three players. The playoffs went from one to six holes. Eight golfers advanced with perfect 3–0–0 records: #1 Dustin Johnson, #8 Alex Norén, #12 Paul Casey, #14 Phil Mickelson, #20 Brooks Koepka, #21 Jon Rahm, #48 William McGirt, and #62 Søren Kjeldsen. Five of the top 16 seeds advanced while three of the bottom 16 seeds advanced. Nine Americans advance to the round of 16.

Final 16 bracket

Breakdown by country

Prize money breakdown

 Source:

References

External links

Coverage on the European Tour's official site
Austin Country Club

WGC Match Play
Golf in Texas
Sports in Austin, Texas
WGC-Dell Technologies Match Play Championship
WGC-Dell Technologies Match Play Championship
WGC-Dell Technologies Match Play Championship
WGC-Dell Technologies Match Play Championship